volcano! is a three-piece rock band from Chicago, Illinois that are influenced by classic rock, post-punk, free jazz and noise rock.

History
The Leaf Label released the trio's critically acclaimed debut, Beautiful Seizure, in the US in late 2005 and worldwide in early 2006.
In 2006 the band did a Take-Away Show session with Vincent Moon.

Discography

Albums
2005 - Beautiful Seizure
2008 - Paperwork
2012 - Piñata

Singles
2006 - Apple or a Gun
2008 - Africa Just Wants to Have Fun
2009 - So Many Lemons

References

External links

MySpace page
volcano! on The Leaf Label
Volcano! Interview at REDEFINE Magazine, January 2006
Video Session with 'They Shoot Music - Don't They'

Rock music groups from Illinois
Musical groups from Illinois
American art rock groups